Pulham Market Big Wood is a  biological Site of Special Scientific Interest south of Long Stratton in Norfolk.

This ancient coppice wood on boulder clay is probably the last fragment of a much larger area of woodland. The standard trees are mature pedunculate oaks and the coppice layer is very overgrown. The ground flora is dominated by bramble, honeysuckle and bracken.

Boudica's Way footpath runs through the wood.

References

Sites of Special Scientific Interest in Norfolk
Long Stratton